George Thomas Simpson (7 June 1856 – 7 August 1906) was an Australian businessman and politician who served in the Legislative Assembly of Western Australia from 1891 to 1899, representing the seat of Geraldton.

Early life
Simpson was born in Sydney to Maria (née Hawthorne) and James Simpson. He initially attended Sydney Grammar School, but his family later moved to Dunedin, New Zealand, where he went to Dunedin High School. Simpson trained as a lawyer but did not complete his training, instead entering commercial life. He moved to Gisborne in 1878, and then returned to Australia in 1883, working as a stockbroker in Broken Hill, New South Wales. He came to Western Australia in 1888, and became the first secretary of the Perth Stock Exchange.

Politics and later life
Simpson was elected to parliament unopposed at an 1891 by-election for the seat of Geraldton, which had been prompted by the resignation of Edward Keane. After being re-elected at the 1894 and 1897 elections, he was declared bankrupt in 1899, and forced to resign his seat. He was unable to reclaim it at the resulting by-election, losing to Richard Robson. From the mid-1890s, Simpson suffered from locomotor ataxia. He was confined to hospital in late 1899, and eventually moved to a nursing home in Subiaco, where he died in 1906 (aged only 50).

See also
 Electoral results for the district of Geraldton

References

1856 births
1906 deaths
Australian expatriates in New Zealand
Australian stockbrokers
Members of the Western Australian Legislative Assembly
People educated at Otago Boys' High School
People educated at Sydney Grammar School
Politicians from Sydney
19th-century Australian politicians
19th-century Australian businesspeople